Bhirani is a village in the Bhadra Tehsil of Hanumangarh district in the Indian state of Rajasthan.
Bhirani is situated at a distance of about 22.1 km from its mandal headquarters Bhadra, 160.5 km from the district headquarters of Hanumangarh and 353.5 km away from the state capital of Jaipur. It is 200 km from national capital New Delhi.
Hisar is the nearest Haryana district.

Founder 
Smart Village Bhirani was founded  Choudhry Moman Ram Beniwal .

Educational institutions  

Schools 
 Government senior secondary School
 Government Sanskrit School 
 M.R.M Public Seniors Secondary school
 Shanti Niketan Secondary school
 Kids Heaven English Medium School
 Holy Angel  English Medium School
 Govt Girls school 
 URM public school
Nearby colleges include :
 Arya B.Ed. College 
 S.G.L.D College for Higher education 
 CSC computer technical institute

Demographics
Rajasthani is the local language.
Haryanvi tone mixup with Rajasthani (madhur language).
This type of language generally used in Bhirani.

References 

Villages in Hanumangarh district
              Blogger-Zakir